Baloch Council of North America (BCNA) is a non-partisan, non-profit advocacy organization in the United States that seeks to "unite all Baloch people and secure Baloch rights, including the right of self-determination, within the Pakistani Federation." BCNA is one of several politically active organizations with roots in the Baloch diaspora, working alongside the Baloch Unity in Russia, and the Baloch Voice Foundation in France.

History
BCNA was originally founded as BSO-NA or Baloch Society of North America in 2004 by Dr. Wahid Baloch in Washington D.C.. Dr. Wahid Baloch graduated from Bolan Medical College in Quetta in 1990 and in 1992, he immigrated to the United States. The BSO-NA lobbied the U.S. government and Israeli political activists to support the independence of Balochistan. In 2012, Dr. Baloch and representatives of American Friends of Balochistan and the Baloch Council of North America met with American Congressmen and allegedly had meetings with several CIA officials. Dr. Baloch had long claimed that the Pakistani state was committing acts of genocide against the Baloch people, and that the government's aim was to plunder the province's vast mineral resources. In January 2014 he released a letter appealing to the United States and Israel for direct assistance in preventing an alleged "killing spree" of Baloch people by what he called the "law enforcement agencies of Pakistan".

Disbandment and reorganization
Dr. Baloch disbanded and reconstituted his organization in 2014 with a newfound emphasis on human rights advocacy. Dr. Baloch disbanded the BSO-NA, saying that the war of independence for Balochistan was actually a "war of independence of Khans, Nawabs and Sardars". He reconstituted the group as the Baloch Council of North America (BCN), dedicated to working with all democratic and nationalist forces in Pakistan to secure Baloch rights through democratic, nonviolent means, within the federation of Pakistan.

References

Baloch diaspora
Political advocacy groups in Pakistan
Foreign policy lobbying organizations in the United States
2004 establishments in the United States
Baloch nationalism